Anse-à-Veau is an arrondissement in the Nippes Department of Haiti. As of 2015, the population was 153,639 inhabitants. Postal codes in the Anse-à-Veau Arrondissement start with the number 75.

The arondissement consists of the following communes:
 Anse-à-Veau
 Arnaud
 L'Asile
 Petit-Trou-de-Nippes
 Plaisance-du-Sud

References

Arrondissements of Haiti
Nippes